Alice Thornton (born Alice Wandesford) (13 February 1626 – January 1707) was a British writer during the English Civil War. Her books were published in part in 1875.

Biography
Thornton was born in Kirklington, North Riding of Yorkshire. She was the younger surviving daughter of Christopher Wandesford, later Lord Deputy of Ireland, and Alice Osborne (died 1659), only daughter of Sir Hewett Osborne and Joyce Fleetwood. She was, through her mother, a first cousin of Thomas Osborne, 1st Duke of Leeds, the leading  English statesman of the 1670s. Thomas Wentworth, 1st Earl of Strafford,  was a distant relative of her father, who was one of his closest friends and political allies, and went with him to Ireland in 1633 on Wentworth's appointment as Lord Deputy. Wentworth, despite his intimidating personality,  treated the Wandesfords as part of his own family, and Alice grew up with his daughters in Dublin Castle. Following Wentworth's downfall in 1640 Alice's father replaced him as Lord Deputy, but died only a few months later. His family fled back to England during the Irish Rebellion of 1641, and after a long and difficult journey, they returned safely to Kirklington.

During the general confusion of their flight her father's will disappeared, and did not turn up again for several years, leading to years of litigation and a bitter family feud over the inheritance to his estate. Alice had by far most to lose in the lawsuit: she knew that the will, which she had in her keeping for a time and had read carefully, made generous provision for her, but without possession of the original will itself she was unable to prove what exactly she was entitled to. Even when the will was eventually found some members of the family disputed its validity, causing her further legal difficulties. Alice married William Thornton in 1651.

She started her autobiography, My first Booke of my Life, on 2 February 1669 when she was 47. The book was originally written as a defence against slander. It contains much valuable information about her father's career, and also contains vivid sketches of her mother, her sister Katherine, and her three brothers.

In August 1662 she and her husband, William, built a house in East Newton in Yorkshire, where Alice spent the remainder of her life. William died in 1668. The marriage was a happy one, and Alice always wrote of her husband with love and gratitude. He has sometimes been blamed for failing to defend his wife's interests against her family, and for leaving her in poverty at his death.  However, Alice in her autobiography places the blame for the dispute over her father's will  firmly on her own family,  and in particular on  her brother Christopher junior and his father-in-law Sir John Lowther.

Of her numerous children, only three, a son and two daughters, reached adult life. The elder daughter, Alice (Naly), married Thomas Comber, Dean of Durham, by whom she had six children. Naly died at a great age in 1720.

Writings
Alice Thornton wrote three manuscripts which she left to her oldest daughter. She was said to have written these manuscripts as a response to rumours about the timeliness of her daughter's marriage. Naly, her eldest daughter, was married three short months after the passing of her father. Alice Thornton was ridiculed for these actions, and the only way she saw fit to answer these allegations correctly was to write about them. The first manuscript was written chronologically, she began with her childhood and worked her way through her life until she reached the death of her husband. This text answered things not only about her actions, but also addressed her faith and the way she took care of her family and household. This text was largely used in the 1875 edition, The Autobiography of Mrs. Alice Thornton, of East Newton, Co. York. The third manuscript contains memories from her first year as a widow. These two volumes were bought at auction by the British Library in 2009. In 2019, the missing second book was traced to the archives of Durham cathedral by Dr Cordelia Beattie.

Death and legacy
Thornton died in 1707 in East Newton and left three books to her daughter, Mrs. Alice Comber, who died in 1727.

In 1875 the Surtees Society published her autobiography. This version was based on three books of her life but expurgated. Two of the volumes were bought at auction by the British Library in 2009. The first book was edited in 2014 by Professor Raymond Anselment. In 2019, the missing second book was traced to the archives of Durham cathedral.

References

External links 
 
 Alice Thornton at the Oxford Dictionary of National Biography (requires access subscription)
 Thornton, Alice, 1626–1707 at FAST

1626 births
1707 deaths
17th-century English writers
17th-century English women writers
People from Hambleton District
English autobiographers